Crockenhill is a village in the Sevenoaks District of Kent, England. It is located 1 mile south of Swanley and 4.5 miles north east of Orpington, adjacent to the Kent border with Greater London.

Etymology
Crockenhill is from Old English hyll "hill" .  "Crocken" comes from the Old English 'crundel' meaning a 'chalk-pit, quarry' with 'hyll' as a 'hill'; therefore a 'quarry on the hill'.(kentpast.co.uk) There is also a village named Crockham Hill near Westerham.

Buildings

The main church in the village is the grade-II listed All Souls Church, built in 1851 by the architect Edwin Nash.

Sport and leisure
Crockenhill has two Non-League football clubs: Crockenhill F.C. who play at Wested Meadow, and Eltham Palace F.C. who play at Green Court Sports Club. Both teams play in the Kent Invicta Football League at level 10 of the English football league system.

Transport

Rail
The nearest National Rail station is Swanley, located 1 mile away.

Buses
Crockenhill is served by Arriva Kent Thameside route 477 to Dartford via Swanley & to Orpington.

Nearby areas

Crockenhill borders Swanley to the north and north east, Eynsford to the east and south east, Well Hill to the south, Orpington to the south west and St Mary Cray, Derry Downs and Kevington to the west and north west.

See also
List of places of worship in Sevenoaks (district)

References

Further reading 
Major, Alan. Hidden Kent. Countryside Books, 1994.

External links 

Crockenhill parish council site

Villages in Kent